Sentinel-1B is a European radar imaging satellite launched on 25 April 2016. It is the second of two original satellites in the Sentinel-1 constellation, part of the European Union's Copernicus programme on Earth observation.  The satellite carries a C-SAR sensor, capable of providing high-resolution imagery regardless of weather conditions.

Satellite made its first observation on 28 April, capturing 250 km wide image of Austfonna glacier on Svalbard.

Beginning on December 23, 2021, the spacecraft experienced an anomaly which resulted in a loss of data transmission. On January 10, 2022, the European Space Agency confirmed online that a power issue was the root cause of the issue and that initial attempts to fix it had failed. The agency confirmed that efforts to restore spacecraft capabilities would continue, before announcing on 3 August 2022 that efforts to recover the mission would end. The power issue disabled the use of the satellite's payload, but otherwise the satellite remains operable, thus allowing ESA to perform a controlled deorbit.

See also

 2016 in spaceflight

References

Copernicus Programme
Earth observation satellites of the European Space Agency
Space synthetic aperture radar
Spacecraft launched by Soyuz-2 rockets
Spacecraft launched in 2016